In college football, 2014 NCAA football bowl games may refer to:

2013–14 NCAA football bowl games, for games played in January 2014 as part of the 2013 season.
2014–15 NCAA football bowl games, for games played in December 2014 as part of the 2014 season.